Plantago altissima is a species of perennial herb in the family Plantaginaceae. They have a self-supporting growth form and simple, broad leaves. Individuals can grow to 0.58 m.

Sources

References 

altissima
Flora of Malta